The provincial council (PS), also known as the States Provincial, is the provincial parliament and legislative assembly in each of the provinces of the Netherlands. It is elected for each province simultaneously once every four years and has the responsibility for matters of sub-national or regional importance. The number of seats in a provincial council is proportional to its population.

The provincial councils originated as Estates assemblies in the Middle Ages, hence the name 'States Provincial'. From 1813 to 1850, the noble members of the ridderschap chose one-third of the members of the provincial councils. Johan Rudolf Thorbecke's reforms and his 'Provinces Law' (Provinciewet) of 1850 brought this privilege to an end.

The provincial council chooses the provincial executive, which is the executive organ of the province. Originally, the States Provincial themselves also had executive powers and chose the provincial executive from among their own members. On 11 March 2003, the two institutions split.

The principal roles of the provincial council have become to set general policies, represent the people, approve provincial legislation and the annual budget and to oversee the executive. Both the provincial executive and the provincial council are chaired by the King's Commissioner in the province, appointed by the monarch every six years.

The last provincial elections were held on 20 March 2019.

Three months after their election, the combined members of the States Provincial elect the members of the Senate of the States General of the Netherlands.

Number of seats in each provincial council
The size of the provincial councils ranges from 39 members for a province with less than 400,000 inhabitants to 55 members for a province with more than 2,000,000 inhabitants.

Before 2007, they ranged from 47 members for a province with less than 200,000 inhabitants to 83 members for a province with more than 2,500,000 inhabitants. As a consequence of a change to the Provinciewet, starting at the provincial elections of 7 March 2007, the total number of provincial councillors was reduced from 764 to 564. A survey of the change in seats per province:

A consequence of this reduction in the number of seats is that the election threshold (the minimum number of votes needed for a party to gain at least one seat in an assembly) has risen.  Depending on the province, the threshold now lies between 1.5% and over 2% of the votes.  Because of this, it has become harder for small parties to win a seat.  This may also have consequences for the representation of small parties in the Senate, which is elected by the members of the States Provincial.

National results 
Outcome of the provincial elections calculated at national level:

Note *: 2003 election calculated for the 2007 number of seats (564).

Elections by party by province

Provincial elections, 2003 
Outcome of the 2003 Dutch provincial elections:

Provincial elections, 2007 
Outcome of the 2007 Dutch provincial elections:

Due to defections from one party to another and other such reasons the number of seats can fluctuate during each inter-elections period.  This table only shows the distribution straight after the elections.

The named 'others' for 2007 are:
 in Groningen: PvhN (by 1 seat)
 in Friesland: FNP (by 5 seats)
 in Utrecht: Mooi Utrecht (by 1 seat)
 in North Holland: ONH/Verenigd Senioren Partij (by 1 seat)
 in South Holland: Leefbaar Zuid-Holland (by 1 seat)
 in Zeeland: PvZ (by 2 seats)
 in North Brabant: Brabantse Partij (by 1 seat)
 in Limburg: PNL (by 1 seat)

Provincial elections, 2011 
Outcome of the 2011 Dutch provincial elections:

The named 'others' for 2011 are:
 in Groningen: PvhN (by 1 seat)
 in Friesland: FNP (by 4 seats)
 in North Holland: ONH (by 1 seat)
 in Zeeland: PvZ (by 2 seats)

Provincial elections, 2015 
Outcome of the 2015 Dutch provincial elections:

The named 'others' for 2015 are:
in Groningen: Groninger Belang (by 3 seats), PvhN (by 1 seat)
in Friesland: FNP (by 4 seats)
in Drenthe; Sterk Lokaal (by 1 seat)
in North Holland: ONH (by 1 seat)
in Zeeland: Zeeland Lokaal (by 1 seat), PvZ (by 1 seat)
in North Brabant: Lokaal Brabant (by 1 seat)
in Limburg: Volkspartij Limburg (by 1 seat), Lokaal-Limburg (by 1 seat)

See also
Provinces of the Netherlands
Interprovinciaal Overleg
Estates of the realm, for the origin of the term
Provincieraad, the equivalent body in Belgium

References

External links
Website of the Interprovinciaal Overleg (IPO)
Official figures of the kiesraad
List of present Statenleden

Government of the Netherlands
Dutch political institutions
Politics of the Netherlands by province